A Mathematician's Lament, often referred to informally as Lockhart's Lament, is a short book on mathematics education by Paul Lockhart, originally a research mathematician at Brown University and U.C. Santa Cruz, and subsequently a math teacher at Saint Ann's School in Brooklyn, New York City for many years. This strongly worded opinion piece is organized into two parts. The first part, "Lamentation", criticizes the way mathematics is typically taught in American schools and argues for an aesthetic, intuitive, and problem-oriented approach to teaching. The second part, "Exultation", gives specific examples of how to teach mathematics as an art.

Background
This book was developed from a 25-page essay that was written in 2002, originally circulated in typewritten manuscript copies, and subsequently published by Keith Devlin on his online column for the Mathematical Association of America's webzine MAA Online.

Quotes
"The first thing to understand is that mathematics is an art. The difference between math and the other arts, such as music and painting, is that our culture does not recognize it as such."

"Other math courses may hide the beautiful bird, or put it in a cage, but in geometry class, it is openly and cruelly tortured."

References

Further reading
 Paul Lockhart, Measurement (Cambridge: Belknap Press of Harvard University Press, 2012). 
------. Arithmetic (Cambridge: Belknap Press of Harvard University Press, 2017).

External links
 Lockhart's Lament, the essay which prefigured A Mathematician's Lament, by Paul Lockhart
 Lockhart's Lament, about the earlier essay, by Keith Devlin

Books about mathematics education
Books about philosophy of mathematics
2009 non-fiction books
Bellevue Literary Press books